Valikabad (also Romanized as Valīkābād) is a village in Estarabad-e Jonubi Rural District, in the Central District of Gorgan County, Golestan Province, Iran. At the 2006 census, its population was 497, in 135 families.

References 

Populated places in Gorgan County